The AVIC Manufacturing Technology Institute is a comprehensive research institute in the field of aeronautical manufacturing technologies, materials and equipments in China. It was established in 1957 and is a subsidiary of the Aviation Industry Corporation of China (AVIC). AS of 2018, it has more than 800 individual members. The current president is Li Zhiqiang.

History
The AVIC Manufacturing Technology Institute traces its origins to the former "Ninth Research Institute of the Second Ministry of Machinery Industry", founded in 1957 and would later become the Beijing Aeronautical Manufacturing Technology Research Institute (BAMTRI). In December 2016, it was renamed "AVIC Manufacturing Technology Institute", which has been used to date.

Organizations
 Beijing Precision Engineering Institute for Aircraft Industry 
 Jinan Special Structure Research Institute
 State Key Laboratory of High Energy Beam Processing Technology
 National Defense Science and Technology Industry Special Welding Innovation Center
 International Joint Research Center for Basic Research of Advanced Aviation Manufacturing Technology
 Beijing Key Laboratory of Complex Component Numerical Control Processing Technology and Equipment
 Beijing Key Laboratory of High Energy Beam Incremental Manufacturing Technology and Equipment 
 Beijing Key Laboratory of Digital Plastic Forming Technology and Equipment 
 Beijing Friction Welding Technology and Equipment Engineering Technology Research Center
 Beijing International Science and Technology Cooperation Base of Aviation Manufacturing Technology and High-end Special Equipment
 Aviation Science and Technology Key Laboratory of Aviation Welding and Connection Technology
 Aviation Science and Technology Key Laboratory of Digital Manufacturing Technology  
 Aviation Science and Technology Key Laboratory of Plastic Forming Technology  
 Aviation Science and Technology Key Laboratory of Additive Manufacturing 
 Aviation Science and Technology Key Laboratory of Precision Manufacturing Technology 
 Aviation Science and Technology Key Laboratory of High Performance Electromagnetic Window
 China Aviation Industry Manufacturing Technology Center
 Research and Development Center of Aviation Special Equipment for Aviation Industry
 Laser Weapon Technology Center of Aviation Industry
 Aviation Industry Intelligent Manufacturing Innovation Center
 AVIC High Tech Co., Ltd.

Scientific publishing
 Aeronautical Manufacturing Technology, founded in 1958

References

External links

Scientific organizations established in 1957
Organizations based in Beijing
1957 establishments in China